Falcon Field may refer to:

 Falcon Field (Arizona), an airport in Mesa, Arizona, United States
 Falcon Field (Georgia), an airport in Peachtree City, Georgia, United States
 Falcon Field (Corinth, Texas), a baseball field 
 Falcon Field (Meriden, Connecticut), a football field
 Falcon Baseball Field, in Colorado Springs, Colorado